General Davies may refer to:

Clinton W. Davies (1899–1989), U.S. Air Force brigadier general
Francis Davies (British Army officer) (1864–1948), British Army general
Henry Eugene Davies (1836–1894), Union Army brigadier general
Henry Lowrie Davies (1898–1975), British Indian Army major general
Henry Rodolph Davies (1865–1950), British Army major general
Peter Ronald Davies (born 1938), British Army major general
Philip Davies (British Army officer) (born 1932), British Army major general
Richard Hutton Davies (1861–1918), New Zealand Military Forces major general
Thomas Davies (British Army officer) (c. 1737–1812), British Army lieutenant general
Thomas Alfred Davies (1809–1899), Union Army brigadier general and brevet major general
William W. Davies (USMC) (1900–1985), U.S. Marine Corps major general

See also
Henry Ferguson Davie (1797–1885), British Army general
William Richardson Davie (1756–1820), U.S. Army brigadier general
William Gabriel Davy (1780–1856), British Army general
Attorney General Davies (disambiguation)
General Davis (disambiguation)